= Ramblones =

Coordinates: 29°10′S 65°25′W

- Municipality and village
- Interactive map of Ramblones
- Country: Argentina
- Province: Catamarca Province
- Time zone: UTC−3 (ART)

Ramblones is a village and municipality in Catamarca Province in northwestern Argentina.
